Mount Orestes is a prominent peak, over 1,600 m, just east of Bull Pass in the Olympus Range of Victoria Land. Named by the Victoria University of Wellington Antarctic Expedition (VUWAE) (1958–59) for a figure in Greek mythology.

Mountains of Victoria Land
McMurdo Dry Valleys